Mohd Hassan Basri Ahmad Ridzuan (born 28 January 1988) is a Malaysian footballer who plays as a left-back for T–Team in the Malaysia Super League.

References

1988 births
Living people
Malaysian footballers
Terengganu FC players
Malaysian people of Malay descent
Association football defenders